Armitage is a historic house on a former plantation in Schriever, Louisiana, U.S.. It was built in 1852 for Francis L. Mead, who lived in the house until 1859, when it was purchased by Charles B. Armitage, his stepson-in-law. It was later acquired by Darden Roundtree, and inherited by his four sons. In 1948, it was purchased by Frank Wurzlow and his wife, and they restored it.

The house was designed in the Greek Revival architectural style. It has been listed on the National Register of Historic Places since April 12, 1984.

References

	
National Register of Historic Places in Terrebonne Parish, Louisiana
Greek Revival architecture in Louisiana
Houses completed in 1852
Plantation houses in Louisiana